Merkholtz railway station is a railway station serving Merkholtz, in the commune of Kiischpelt, in northern Luxembourg.  It is operated by Chemins de Fer Luxembourgeois, the state-owned railway company.

Service
The station is situated on a branch of Line 10, which connects Luxembourg City to the centre and north of the country. Merkholtz is the first station on the branch, which terminates at Wiltz.

Like Paradiso, it is unique insofar as it is an optional stop ; to get off at Merkholtz, one must notify the train personnel, to get on, one must stand on the platform and raise a hand.

Gallery

References

External links

 Official CFL page on Merkholtz station
 Rail.lu page on Merkholtz station

Kiischpelt
Railway stations in Luxembourg
Railway stations on CFL Line 10